Mahadevendra Saraswathi V was the 67th Shankaracharya of the Kanchi matha.

Life and times 
Saraswathi was born Lakshmikanthan to Narasimha Sastri and Lakshmi in 1889. It is also said that he was named Lakshminarasimha (combining his parents' names). 

He was given the title Mahadevendra Saraswathi and made the Shankaracharya in 1907. He occupied the post for a brief period of seven days and died in 1907. He was succeeded by his first cousin, Swaminathan, a boy of thirteen, who became the sixty-eighth Shankaracharya with the title Chandrashekarendra Saraswati VIII. 

He was on the service of his guru Chandra Chandrashekarendra Saraswati swamy VII who was the pontiff of the mutt from 1891.  When he was offered the position of next Acharya after Chandrashekarendra Saraswati swamy VII,  Lakshmikanthan who incidentally belong to Thiruvisainallur , refused to become the Acharya, but preferred to be in the service of Chandrashekarendra saraswathi swamy-7 wherever he goes. On hearing this, Chandrashekarendra saraswathi swamy-7 was moved by his 'Gurubhakthi' and told that as his time in this world is coming to an end, let him accept the Acharya position till Swaminathan comes from Villupuram. After that, "I will call you to whichever place I will be in".  Similar to that, the moment Mahaperiyava touched the soil of Kalavai, Mahadevendra Saraswathi -V, left this material world by attaining siddhi.  

Sri Mahadevendra Saraswathi's Samadhi is located in Kalavai, next to his Guru, Sri Chandrasekahrendra Saraswathi VII's samadhi.
He was also struck by the same disease that caused the Siddhi of his Guru. He died within seven days of ascending the throne of the mutt. But before he died, he had sent word for Swaminathan to be his successor. 

Shankaracharyas